Ruthless Records is an American record label founded by Eazy-E in 1987, specializing in hip hop music. The discography includes all albums, compilations, EPs and singles released.

Studio releases and extended plays

Compilation albums

Singles

Hip hop discographies
Discographies of American record labels